Nexus Centre City Mall is a shopping mall located in the South Indian city of Mysore, Karnataka. It is the largest in Mysuru. The mall is owned and operated by Bengaluru-based real estate giant Prestige Group and is located in the Nazarbad area of Mysore.

Nexus Centre City Mall houses many international brands' showrooms under one roof, including those of H&M, Apple, Max Fashion, William Penn, and many other. The mall is open Mondays through Sundays, including on public holidays from 10:00 AM IST UTC +5:30 and closes at 10:00 PM IST.

History 
Nexus Centre City was opened to the public in February 2018. It is the largest mall in Mysore.

Location 
Nexus Centre City Mall is located at No. 5, Hyder Ali Road, Nazarbad Mohalla, Mysuru.

Facilities 
The mall has shopping area of 3,47,000 sqft and houses 100+ brands. It has a 6 screen PVR Multiplex, Many brands such as H&M, American Tourister, Crocs, Max have their outlets in the mall. It houses a Loyal world supermarket, unisex salon and spas. Many eateries are available in the food court including Hatti Kaapi, Domino's Pizza, McDonald's, KFC etc. It also has gaming arcade for kids and for adults under one roof.

References 

2018 establishments in Karnataka
Shopping malls in Mysore
Shopping malls established in 2018